Breckenridge may refer to:

People 
Breckenridge (surname)
Breckenridge Ellis

Places

United States 
Breckenridge, Colorado
Breckenridge Ski Resort, an alpine ski resort in the western United States, in Colorado at the town of Breckenridge
Breckenridge 100, annual bike race
Breckenridge, Hancock County, Illinois
Breckenridge, Sangamon County, Illinois
Breckenridge, Indiana
Breckenridge, Michigan
Breckenridge, Minnesota
Breckenridge, Missouri
Breckenridge, Oklahoma
Breckenridge, Texas
Breckenridge Hills, Missouri
Breckenridge Reservoir, on Chopawamsic Creek, Virginia
Breckenridge Township, Caldwell County, Missouri
Breckenridge Township, Wilkin County, Minnesota

Canada 
Breckenridge Greens, Edmonton, Alberta

See also 
Brackenridge (disambiguation)
Breckinridge (disambiguation)